Asom Ratna (অসম ৰত্ন) is the highest civilian award in the State of Assam, India. It is being conferred for outstanding contribution in literature, art and culture and social service. The award is offered by the Government of Assam. It was started in 2009 and Dr. Bhupen Hazarika was first awardee. Famous Indian scientist from Assam Dr. Jitendranath Goswami who got Asom Ratna for 2015 is last awardee. The award carries a cash prize of ₹300,000, a plaque and a shawl.

Recipients

References

Civil awards and decorations of Assam